Jimmy Ray is the debut album by British singer Jimmy Ray, released on 10 March 1998. He wrote or co-wrote every song on the album. It debuted at No. 112 on the Billboard 200, and also reached No. 2 on the Heatseekers Chart. Its only successful single, "Are You Jimmy Ray?", made the album a substantial success. "Goin' to Vegas" and "I Got Rolled" did not chart in the US, but had some minor success in Ray's native UK.

Musical style 

The sound of Jimmy Ray is a fusion of rockabilly, pop, hip hop and alternative rock.

Track listing
All songs written by Jimmy Ray and Con Fitzpatrick, except where noted.

"Are You Jimmy Ray?" (Saxes, Gary Barnacle) – 3:29
"Goin' to Vegas" – 3:30
"I Got Rolled" – 3:38
"Daddy's Got a Gun" – 3:33
"Way Low" – 3:33
"Look Inside for Love" (Ray) – 3:35
"Trippin' on Baby Blue" – 3:54
"Sex for Beginners" – 3:12
"Let It Go Go" (Ray) – 3:36
"Free at Last" (Ray) – 3:15

Charts

References

1998 debut albums
Epic Records albums
Jimmy Ray albums
Albums recorded at The Church Studios